A eunuch is a castrated man. Castration has had a social function in history. In China, castration included the removal of the penis and the testicles (emasculation). A knife removed both organs at the same time. Eunuchs have existed in China since about 146 AD, during the reign of Emperor Huan of Han and were common as civil servants by the Qin dynasty. From ancient times to the Sui dynasty, castration was a traditional punishment (one of the Five Punishments) and a means of gaining employment in the imperial service. Some eunuchs, such as the Ming dynasty official Zheng He, gained power that superseded that of the Grand Secretaries. Self-castration was not uncommon, although it was not always performed thoroughly and was later banned.

Eunuchs were employed as high-ranking civil servants because they could not have children, so they were not tempted to seize power and begin a dynasty. In addition, many in the palace considered eunuchs more reliable than scholar-officials. Finally, as a symbolic assignment of divine authority in the palace system, a constellation of stars was designated as the emperor's; west of the constellation, four stars were known as his "eunuchs."

The tension between eunuchs in the service of the emperor and virtuous Confucian officials is a familiar theme in Chinese history. In his History of Government, Samuel Finer writes that reality often needs to be clearly defined. The emperor valued capable eunuchs as advisers, and resistance from "virtuous" officials often stemmed from jealousy. Ray Huang says that eunuchs represented the personal will of the Emperor, and the officials represented the political will of the bureaucracy; a clash between them would have been a clash of ideologies or political agendas.

The number of eunuchs in imperial employment fell to 470 by 1912. The Chinese government abolished the eunuch system on November 5, 1924. The last imperial eunuch, Sun Yaoting, died in December 1996.

History

Qin (221–206 BC) and Han dynasties (202 BC–9 AD, 25–220 AD) 
Men sentenced to castration became eunuch slaves of the Qin dynasty, performing forced labor for projects such as the Terracotta Army. The Qin government confiscated the property and enslaved and castrated the families of rapists as punishment. 

In Han dynasty China, references to castration were gōngxíng (宮刑 "palace punishment") or fǔxíng (腐刑 "rotting punishment"), and euphemistically as being "sent to the silkworm house," referring to the new castrate's confinement in a room (like a silkworm) to prevent infection and death. In addition, punished castrated men during the Han dynasty were used for slave labor.

Notable men castrated under Han law included:
 Historian Sima Qian was charged with dissent and castrated.
 Emperor Wu ordered the castration of a prince of Loulan Kingdom Xinjiang as punishment for breaking a law.
 Zhang He, the older brother of Zhang Anshi, had been sentenced to death but was castrated when his brother pleaded for a commuted castration sentence.
 Li Yannian suffered punishment by castration for a crime.
 Envoy Ge Du (Ke Too) was castrated for not killing the "Mad King" of the Wusun, instead helping the king by supplying doctors to cure his illness.
 Su Wen suffered castration for supporting prince Liu Fuling and his mother, Lady Zhao, against Liu Ju (crown prince of Wei) and his mother, Wei Zifu.

Near the end of the Han dynasty in 189, a group of eunuchs known as the Ten Attendants gained considerable power in the imperial court; several warlords planned their murder to restore the emperor's government. The loyalist warlord He Jin was lured into a trap in the palace and killed by the eunuchs. The other warlords, led by Yuan Shao, stormed the court and massacred the Ten Attendants and many other eunuchs. In the wake of the fighting, Dong Zhuo seized power. Castration was abolished twice as a punishment under the Han dynasty: before 167 BC, then during the 110s AD.

Northern Wei (386–535 AD) and Northern Qi (550–577 AD) dynasties 
In 446 AD, the Northern Wei crushed an ethnic Qiang rebellion. Wang Yu was a castrated Qiang eunuch who may have undergone castration during the uprising as the Northern Wei frequently castrated elite young Qiang. He was born in the town of Lirun, in Fengyi prefecture (present-day Chengcheng County). Wang Yu, a Buddhist, had a temple built at his birthplace in 488.

The Northern Wei had the young sons of rebels and traitors castrated, forcing them to serve in the palace as eunuchs. Notable survivors of this practice include Liu Siyi (Liu Ssu-i), Yuwen Zhou (Yü-wen Chou 宇文冑), Duan Ba, Wang Zhi, Liu Teng, and Sun Shao. The Northern Qi Gao Huan had Shu Lüè castrated and made a messenger eunuch because his father, Fan Guan (Fan Kuan 樊觀), remained loyal to the Northern Wei. The Northern Wei presented northern wives to Liu Song generals Cui Mo and Shen Mo. Shen Mo had a son, Lingdu, and fled back south to Liu Song; in retaliation, the Northern Wei castrated Lingdu. Cui Mo never returned south, and his northern son escaped punishment.

The eunuch Zong Ai killed two Northern Wei emperors and a prince. The Empress Dowager Hu (Northern Qi) mourned for the eunuch Meng Luan. She reportedly engaged in sexual relations with her eunuchs; traditional historians used the term xiexia (褻狎, "immoral games"), rather than "adultery", to describe her acts with them.

Sui (581–618 AD) and Tang dynasties (618–907 AD) 
Indigenous people from southern China endured castration for use as eunuchs during the Sui and Tang dynasties. For example, the rebel An Lushan had a Khitan (Liao) eunuch named Li Zhu'er (李豬兒) (Li Chu'er) when he was a teenager. Lushan used a sword to cut off Zhu'er's genitals, nearly killing him from blood loss and reviving him after putting ashes on his injury. Zhu'er then served Lushan for life and was highly trusted by him, frequently aiding the obese Lushan at home and in the Huaqing (Hua-ch'ing) steam baths. Lushan developed a skin disease and became blind and paranoid later in life, which prompted him to flog and murder his subordinates. Lushan's enemies convinced Zhu'er and Yan Zhuang (Yen Chuang) (嚴莊) to assassinate him, and Zhu'er disemboweled Lushan.

Liao (916–1125 AD), Jin (1115–1234 AD), and Yuan (1271–1368 AD) dynasties 
The Liao, Jin, and Yuan dynasties regularly castrated enemy prisoners of war under age 10, forcing them to serve royalty or esteemed citizens. As a result, the war created many opportunities for men and women to kidnap the young sons of enemy combatants and elite civilians. Khitan (Liao) women would fight beside men in combat, and these women took advantage of the number of captured young prisoners of war to fill their palaces with prepubescent eunuchs. These young eunuchs were domestic enslaved people, frequently serving harems of royal women, titled ladies of the court, and concubines, and had no political or social power.

The Khitans captured Chinese eunuchs at the Jin court after their Later Jin invasion. Their war with the Song dynasty helped the Khitans to create more eunuchs. The Khitan Empress Dowager Chengtian led a raid on China and captured 100 young (under age 10), attractive Han Chinese boys to make into eunuchs. One of these eunuchs was Wang Ji'en (王继恩 (辽朝)); another was Zhao Anren (赵安仁). Notable Jin dynasty eunuchs were Liang Chong (梁珫) and Song Gui (宋珪).

Like the dynasties which rose and fell before theirs, the Khitans enacted an ordinance permitting castration in 962 after the rape of a footsoldier's young daughter during the reign of Emperor Muzong of Liao. The rapist (an uncle of an imperial consort) was castrated and enslaved to his victim for life. Like the Mongol Empire, Goryeo (Korea) provided eunuchs to the Mongols; they included Bak Bulhwa, Go Yongbo, and Bang Sinu. Some eunuchs adopted Mongol names.

Ming dynasty (1368–1644) 
Castration became a banned legal punishment at the end of Ming Taizu's reign, the first Ming emperor, who reigned over eunuchs from Mongolian, Korea, Vietnamese, Cambodian, Central Asian, Thai, and Okinawan tribes. There were also Korean, Jurchen, Mongolian, Central Asian, and Vietnamese eunuchs under the Yongle Emperor, including Mongol eunuchs who served him when he was the Prince of Yan. Muslim and Mongol eunuchs were in the Ming court, such as those captured from Mongol-controlled Yunnan in 1381; among them was the Ming maritime explorer Zheng He, who served Yongle. The Ming court sent Muslim eunuchs as ambassadors to the Timurids. Vietnamese eunuchs, including Ruan Lang, Ruan An (Nguyễn An), Fan Hong, Chen Wu, and Wang Jin, were sent by Zhang Fu. Korea sent 198 eunuchs, many from Southeast Asia and Korea, to Ming Taizu before ending human tribute in 1435. By the late Ming dynasty, nearly 80 percent of eunuchs came from North China (primarily the Beijing region).

Violence in surrounding countries 
Ming Taizu had a contentious relationship with the Korean Joseon dynasty, often competing for influence over the Jurchens in Manchuria. Korean-born Ming eunuch ambassadors flogged Korean officials due to their unmet demands. Ambassadors were sometimes arrogant; in 1398, a drunk Sin Kwi-Saeng brandished a knife in the king's presence at dinner. Sino-Korean relations later became amiable, and the Korean envoy's seat at the Ming court was the highest of the tributaries. The Jurchen eunuch explorer Yishiha lived during the Yongle emperor's reign.

During the Miao rebellions, the Ming governor castrated thousands of Miao boys and gave them to officials as enslaved people; however, Emperor Yingzong of Ming reprimanded him. Prince Zhu Shuang had several Tibetan boys castrated, and Tibetan women seized after a war against the Tibetans. He was a denounced prince after his death.

During the Lê dynasty, Vietnamese emperor Lê Thánh Tông cracked down on foreign contacts and enforced isolationism. His policies affected trade between Guangdong (Leizhou Peninsula and Hainan) and Vietnam, with accounts of captured Chinese sailors blown off course being captured and castrated to become slaves of the Vietnamese.

Malay envoys from the Malacca Sultanate were attacked and captured in 1469 by the Vietnamese navy as they returned to Malacca from China. The Vietnamese enslaved and castrated the young captives.

A 1499 entry in the Ming Shilu reported that during the 1460s, under the Chenghua Emperor (1464–1487 AD), 13 Chinese men from Wenchang (including Wu Rui) were captured by the Vietnamese after their ship was blown off course from Hainan to Guangdong's Qin subprefecture (Qinzhou) and landed near the coast of Vietnam. The Emperor enslaved 12 of the 13 sailors as agricultural laborers; the youngest Chinese man, Wu Rui (吳瑞), was selected by the Vietnamese court for castration and became a eunuch at the Imperial Citadel of Thang Long for nearly 25 years. After the death of Lê Thánh Tông in 1497, Wu Rui became a military superintendent in northern Vietnam. An Lạng Sơn guard told him about a route back to China, and Rui escaped to Longzhou after walking for nine days through the mountains. Local ethnic minority Tusi chief Wei Chen took him into custody, overruling objections from his family (who wanted to return him to Vietnam). Learning about his escape and fearing that he would reveal Vietnamese state secrets, officials sent an agent to repurchase Rui from Wei Chen. An argument about price began; Pingxiang magistrate Li Guangning rescued Rui and sent him to Beijing to serve in the Ming palace.

In 1467, a similar entry in the Đại Việt sử ký toàn thư reports that a Chinese ship blew onshore in the An Bang province of Dai Viet (present-day Quảng Ninh Province). Lê Thánh Tông ordered the Chinese to be detained and not allowed to return to China. Historians Leo K. Shin, John K. Whitmore, and Tana Li suggest that these accounts of sailors blown off course and being captured and castrated may point to Chinese involvement in illegal trade, which the Vietnamese government suppressed. 

Rumors about the Ming Zhengde Emperor's possible conversion to Islam abounded after he encouraged his Muslim eunuchs to commission the production of porcelain with blue-and-white inscriptions in Persian and Arabic. Suspicion grew when the emperor was associated with an anti-pig-slaughter mandate, although the author of the proclamation is unknown. Muslim eunuchs contributed money in 1496 to repair the Niujie Mosque, the largest mosque and Muslim cultural center in Beijing, and the emperor's association with his Muslim eunuchs triggered gossip. 

The emperor employed nearly 70,000 eunuchs by the end of the Ming dynasty, with some serving in the imperial palace. The dynasty's eunuch population peaked at 100,000. In popular cultural texts, such as Zhang Yingyu's The Book of Swindles, eunuchs were described negatively and accused of enriching themselves with excessive taxation and indulging in cannibalism and sexual debauchery.

The Southern Ming Yongli emperor's wife, Empress Wang, had a young eunuch enslaved person who later wrote an account detailing his childhood in Huguang province's Jingzhou prefecture. First, the eunuch writes that rebels killed his parents; one of the rebels adopted him, who later became a Southern Ming soldier. Then, in 1656, the Southern Ming court ordered high-ranking military officers to give up their sons over the age of seven years for castration in Kunming (Yunnan Fu) and enslavement in the Yongli court. Over 20 boys were castrated one month after the order, including Empress Wang's slave (despite his adoptive father's attempts to save him).

Wang Ruoshue and Pang Tianshou were eunuchs in Zhu Youlang's court.

Imperial eunuchs 
In Ming China, eunuchs were a cornerstone of daily operations in the imperial palace. First and foremost was maintaining a comfortable life for the emperor. Their other responsibilities varied in significance, encompassing almost every aspect of the palace routine. They included procuring copper, tin, wood, and iron and repairing and constructing ponds, castle gates, and palaces in major cities like Beijing and Nanjing and the mansions and mausoleums of imperial relatives. Eunuchs prepared meals for many people and cared for pets and wild animals in and around the palace.

They worked closely with other professionals in the palace, frequently associating with those in lower-ranking occupations. In addition, some eunuchs had supportive partnerships with serving women in the palace; the name for such a pair was a "vegetarian couple" (duishi). The relationships offered security and protection to both parties, enabling them to interact with higher-ranking Mandarin bureaucrats.

The duties of eunuchs evolved. The Hongwu Emperor decreed that a few uneducated eunuchs should be kept (to prevent them from seizing power). Still, later emperors began to train and educate eunuchs and often made them their secretaries. The elimination of previous restrictions allowed some eunuchs (particularly Wang Zhen, Liu Jin, and Wei Zhongxian) to attain great power. The Yongle Emperor established the Eastern Depot, a spy and secret police agency run by eunuchs from 1420 to 1644. Zheng He was a seafaring pioneer who spread Chinese influence extensively.

Reputation 
Eunuchs were controversial in Ming China as they had a reputation for spying. They served the harem and the emperors who believed they could carry valuable information. Fearful bureaucrat scholars thought of eunuchs as greedy, evil, cunning, and duplicitous because they worked in the palace or other official houses with many concubines. In Chinese society, castration broke conventional moral rules; a son without a male heir to carry on the family name contradicted Confucian ideology. Eunuchs in the palace were stereotyped as exceeding their authority in areas where they did not belong. The Yongle Emperor allowed them to supervise the implementation of political tasks, and eunuchs sometimes interfered in the succession to the throne. As their presence and power increased, they gradually took over the duties of female palace musicians and became the dominant Ming palace musicians.

Qing dynasty (1634-1912) 

Although eunuchs were employed by all Chinese dynasties, their opportunities declined during the Qing dynasty; their work was largely replaced by the Imperial Household Department, which had managed their employment since the reign of the Kangxi Emperor. The Qing palace tended to recruit eunuchs from Zhili who were primarily unmarried adolescent-to-mid-20s Han Chinese from northern Shandong and the counties of Wanping, Jinghai, Daxing, and Hejian in southern Hebei near Beijing. A small number of southern Chinese from Yunnan, Zhejiang, and Guangdong became eunuchs, but the increase was minor compared to the number of eunuchs from the counties around Beijing. In 1621, the Qing beile (princes) were erroneously told that their palace women would have sex with their young male slaves and were instructed to have the slaves castrated by Nurhaci.

At the beginning of the 20th century, about 2,000 eunuchs worked in the Forbidden City; they were notorious for corruption and theft during the later dynasty after being routinely beaten and abused as slaves governed by a frequently hostile and violent emperor. Many men willingly became eunuchs because of poverty in China, also experiencing physical violence to live a better life. Puyi, the last emperor, wrote about growing up in the Forbidden City: "By the age of 11, flogging eunuchs was part of my daily routine. My cruelty and love of power were already too firmly set for persuasion to have any effect on me... Whenever I was in a bad temper the eunuchs would be in for trouble." A yellow bag with bamboo sticks were kept in the Forbidden City, and Empress Dowager Cixi once ordered the palace servant girls and court women to beat the eunuchs with them. Eunuchs would be punished more unless they begged their mistress (or master) for mercy.

Lin Shuangwen rebellion and aftermath 
A new policy of castrating rebels and the sons of killers of three or more related people helped bolster the dwindling supply of young eunuchs for the Qing summer palace. The Qing lowered their age limit for castrating the sons of rebels from nine to four years of age. The Qing Imperial Household Department sometimes waited until the boys were 11 years old before castrating them; two young, imprisoned sons of executed murderer Sui Bilong from Shandong were not castrated until they were older. However, the department immediately castrated 11-year-old, Hunanese Fang Mingzai after his father was executed for murder. One hundred thirty sons of participants in the Lin Shuangwen rebellion, aged four to fifteen, were castrated on the orders of the Qianlong Emperor and Heshen (including rebel leader Zhuang Datian's four-year-old grandson, Zhuang Amo). The rebel leader Datian's family and the family of Lin Da were punished for their participation in the rebellion. Lin Shuangwen ordered Lin Da to lead a group of 100 rebels, and titled him "General Xuanlue". After the rebellion, Lin Da was executed by Lingchi at age 42. He had six sons; the two eldest died before the rebellion, his third son (Lin Dou) died of disease in Beijing before he could be castrated, and his fourth and fifth sons (11-year-old Lin Biao and 8-year-old Lin Xian) were castrated. His sixth and youngest son (seven-year-old Lin Mading) was adopted by his uncle, Lin Qin; since Lin Qin did not join the rebellion, Lin Mading was not castrated and had two children after marrying in 1800.

Castration policy changes 
The Qing policy of castrating the sons of rebels and murderers with three or more victims was inspired by the 1781 case of an 18-year-old nephew of a rebel whose death sentence was commuted to castration. Castration for the sons of rebels and murderers was reintroduced by the Qing during the 18th century, after its abolition in the Tang and Ming dynasties. In 1793, Qianlong and the Imperial Household Department (under Heshen) decreed that the sons of murderers over age 16 would be exiled as slaves to the frontier after castration; sons under 16 would be kept as eunuchs in the imperial palace, in the belief that the younger sons could be controlled more easily.

Sons of murderers 
The Qianlong Emperor reviewed the case of Zhao Cheng (赵成), who slept with his son's wife. His son, Zhao Youliang, did not want to report his father and took his wife to the safety of their relatives (the Niu family). Zhao Cheng's friend, Sun Si (孙四), helped him murder five members of the Niu family (which he blamed on his son). Under torture and interrogation, Zhao Youliang did not implicate his father. Officials surmised that the murders were probably committed by more than one person and, after torturing and interrogating the Niu family's neighbors, learned that Zhao Cheng and Sun Si committed the murders. The penalty for mass murder was the execution of the same number of individuals from the perpetrator's family as the murder victims. Officials were hesitant to execute Zhao Youliang for his father's crimes and asked the Qianlong Emperor for guidance. The emperor decided that the son should be castrated; although he was the son of a murderer, he was victimized by his father.

In 1791, a mass murderer killed 11 and injured 12 unrelated people. The Qing punishment-by-castration policy made clear the two requirements to grant a murderer castration instead of execution: at least three people must be murdered, and all victims must be members of the same family. Disregarding the requirement for a victim-familial relationship, the Qing Emperor ordered the murderer's sons to be castrated instead of executed. In a related 1789 incident in Henan, three brothers were killed and a fourth brother was severely injured in an attack by a tenant farmer named Zhang. The emperor ordered the castration of Zhang's two sons, instead of execution; Zhang was sentenced to death by lingchi. In 1872, Liu Ch'ang-Yu of Henan was taken by the Imperial Household Department for castration when he became of age to be enslaved as a eunuch in a princely establishment; his father had murdered several relatives.

Sons of rebels 
The Qing changed its law about the punishment by castration of sons of rebels four times (in 1801, 1814, 1835, and 1845), saying that if the sons and grandsons of rebels claimed ignorance of their father (or grandfather's) rebellious intent they would be sent to the Imperial Household Department for castration as adults or children. Notable Qing enactments were:
 1849: Taiping rebel Shi Dakai's two sons, five-year-old Shi Dingzhong and his younger brother Shi Dingji were sentenced to imprisonment until they reached age 11 (when they would be castrated). It is unknown if the castrations were carried out.
 1856: Rebels were captured in the metropolitan province of Zhili with several boys under the age of 15. The rebel adults were beheaded, and the boys were castrated.
 1862: Qing forces under Zuo Zongtang suppressed the 1862–1877 Dungan Revolt. The sons of Muslim Hui and Salar rebel leaders in Ningxia, Gansu, and Qinghai, including Ma Benyuan (马本源), were castrated by the Imperial Household Department at age 11 and sent to work as slaves for garrisons in Xinjiang. The wives of the rebel leaders were also enslaved. Ma Jincheng, a son of the Hui Naqshbandi leader Ma Hualong, was also castrated. The department castrated and enslaved Ma Guiyuan's (马桂源) nine sons, since they had reached age 12, and sent them to Qing soldiers in Xinjiang.
 1870: Zhang Wenxiang (張汶祥) was accused of the assassination of Ma Xinyi and executed. Before his execution, he was forced to watch his 11-year-old son Zhang Changpao (張長幅) being tortured to get him to confess to the assassination (thought to be a conspiracy by the Qing government against Ma Xinyi). After his father's execution, the boy was castrated by the Imperial Household Department.
 1872: Li Mao-Tz'e (Li Maozi), who had rebelled at the border of Henan (Honan) and Anhui (Anhwei) provinces, was executed. His six-year-old son, Li Liu, was captured by Qing forces in Anhui and handed over to Yulu (Yu Luh), the governor of Anhui. Imprisoned in the office of the district magistrate of Huaining (Hwaining) until reaching age 11 in 1877; he was handed to the Imperial Household Department for castration. His case appeared on 28 November 1877 in the Peking Gazette.
 1879: Central Asian Muslim conqueror Yaqub Beg was accused of rebellious sedition in 1879, which resulted in the capture of his three sons and one grandson under the age of ten. The court waited until the boys were 11 before trying them for their assumed knowledge of their father's sedition; they faced a slow, agonizing execution if found guilty, and castration and enslavement if acquitted. They were found not guilty and handed over to the Imperial Household Department for castration. Surviving members of Beg's family included four sons, four grandchildren (two boys and two girls), and four wives. All died in prison in Lanzhou, Gansu, or were killed.
 1907: Anti-Qing revolutionary Xu Xilin (Hsü Hsi-lin) and his son, Xu Xuewen (1906–1991), were arrested by the Qing. Under Qing law, Xu Xuewen (who was under the age of 16), was supposed to be castrated as punishment. The Qing was overthrown in 1912, however, and the castration was not carried out.

Young eunuchs used for intimate services 

Sir John Barrow, 1st Baronet noted on his visit to the Qing summer palace as part of the 1793 Macartney Mission that there were two types of Chinese eunuchs: those without testicles (who inspected and maintained buildings, gardens, and other palace works) and those (called rasibus by local Catholic missionaries) who had also had their penises and testicles – amputated. Barrow notes that the term "black eunuch" referred not to skin color but referenced the Ottoman Empire term for eunuchs who had their penis removed. These eunuchs served inside the palace, attending to the imperial harem. The young, emasculated eunuchs, considered nearly as coquettish as the women they served, often painted their faces like the imperial women. Barrow noted that all the Chinese eunuchs (including the rasibus) had female slaves, purchased from poor families who sold their daughters. The Qing court and the eunuchs, however, considered eunuchs male and not female or third sex.

The 19th-century British researcher George Carter Stent and later historian Norman A. Kutcher observed that young eunuchs were prized by female members of the Qing imperial family as attendants. Both note that young eunuchs were physically attractive, considered "completely pure", and were used for "impossible to describe" duties by female members of the imperial family. Kutcher suggests that the boys were used for sexual pleasure by Qing imperial women, likening them to other young eunuchs called "earrings" who were also used for that purpose. Young eunuchs were used for intimate bathroom and bedroom duties by palace ladies.

During the Qing dynasty, emasculated eunuchs had to resort to dildos, oral sex, or foreplay to satisfy women sexually. Liang Zhangju (1775–1849) wrote in his "Wandering Talk" sketches that palace eunuchs performed oral sex on the women and caressed them until the women were sexually satisfied. Eunuchs used dildos and hormones to have a "dry-run orgasm with diminished sensation to reduce the effects of castration", especially if they were past puberty when castrated. Eunuchs still had a sexual desire after castration but were sexually frustrated. The eunuch Zhang Delang engaged in sexual acts with a prostitute in Tianjin's Japanese concession (where he lived after the fall of the Qing) and married three women. Yu Chunhe, a eunuch who worked for Delang, said he was "burning with fever and desire" as he watched Delang and the prostitute. Cixi (Tsu-Hsi) suggested that eunuch Xiao Dezhang (Hsiao Teh-chang) (Zhang Lande) become a sexual partner of the Longyu empress (Lung-yu), since the Guangxi emperor (Kuang Hsu) was impotent. Zhang Lande also had a love affair with Han banner woman Yu Roung Ling, a sister of Princess Der Ling. Sexual relations and marriage between eunuchs and palace maids was referred to as duishi.

Eunuchs and Banner-women 

The Manchu palace maid Ronger (榮兒) (b. 1880) of the Manchu Hešeri clan wrote The Memoirs of a Palace Maid, an autobiography about her experiences as a Qing palace maid. She retired from service at age 18 and was married to Liu, a Han Chinese eunuch given to her by the Dowager Empress Cixi and an adopted son of eunuch Liu Lianying. Ronger writes that Qing court rules required that all court eunuchs must be Han Chinese and not from the Eight Banners (administrative and military divisions in the Later Jin and Qing dynasties into which all Manchu households were placed). All palace maids had to be Manchu Banner-women from the three Upper Banners and were required to "stay ten years at the palace to wait upon Her Majesty, and then they are free to marry". Han girls were not allowed to be palace maids unless their Han Banner-man father was a high official of the sixth rank or higher, and Han fathers were not required to send their daughters to serve.

End of the dynasty 
The Qing dynasty ended after the 1911 Revolution. Puyi (the last Qing emperor) continued to live in the Forbidden City with his eunuchs with financial support from the new Chinese republic until 1924 when he and his entourage were expelled by the warlord general Feng Yuxiang. In 1923, after a fire that Puyi believed was started to cover the theft of his imperial treasures, he expelled the eunuchs from the Forbidden City.

Notable eunuchs

First millennium BC 
 Zhao Gao (d. 210 BC) – favorite of Qin Shihuangdi; plotted against Li Si.
 Sima Qian – first to practice modern historiography (the gathering and analysis of both primary and secondary sources) to write a monumental history of the Chinese empire

First millennium AD 
 Cai Lun – formerly credited with inventing paper before the discovery of earlier paper manuscripts

Second millennium AD 
 Jia Xian – Chinese mathematician who invented the Jia Xian triangle for the calculation of square and cube roots
 Zheng He (1371–1433) – admiral who led large Chinese fleets for exploration in the Indian Ocean
 Huang Hao – Shu eunuch who appears in the Romance of the Three Kingdoms
 Cen Hun – Wu eunuch during the Three Kingdoms Period
 Gao Lishi – a loyal and trusted friend of Tang emperor Xuanzong
 Li Fuguo – Tang eunuch who began another era of eunuch rule
 Yu Chao'en – Tang eunuch who began his career as an army supervisor
 Yang Liangyao – Tang court eunuch with a distinguished diplomatic career, most notably to the Abbasid Caliphate in 785
 Wang Zhen – first powerful Ming eunuch; see Tumu Crisis
 Gang Bing – patron saint of Chinese eunuchs who castrated himself to demonstrate loyalty to the Yongle Emperor
 Yishiha – admiral in charge of expeditions of the Amur River under the Yongle and Xuande Emperors
 Liu Jin – corrupt Ming eunuch official and de facto emperor, a member of the Eight Tigers
 Wei Zhongxian – Ming dynasty eunuch, considered the most powerful eunuch in Chinese history
 Wu Rui – Chinese eunuch in Lê dynasty Annam (Vietnam)
 An Dehai (184412 September 1869) – Qing palace eunuch, confidant, and favorite of Empress Dowager Cixi who was executed in a power struggle between the empress dowager and Prince Chun
 Li Lianying – despotic Qing eunuch
 Xin Xiuming (1878–1959) – in Emperor Puyi's service from 1902 to 1911; abbot of the Taoist temple at Babaoshan Revolutionary Cemetery in 1930; wrote Eunuch's Recollection, a memoir 
 Sun Yaoting (1902–1996) – last surviving imperial eunuch

References

Bibliography 

 
 
 
 
 
 </ref>
 
 
 
 
 
 Tuotuo. Liaoshi [History of Liao]. Beijing: Zhonghua shuju, 1974 (or Tuotuo, Liaoshi (Beijing: Zhonghua shuju, 1974))
 
 
 
 
 
 
 
 
 
 "A Eunuch Cooks Boys to Make a Tonic of Male Essence," in Zhang Yingyu, The Book of Swindles: Selections from a Late Ming Collection, translated by Christopher Rea and Bruce Rusk (New York, NY: Columbia University Press, 2017), pp. 138–141.
 Mary M. Anderson, Hidden Power: The Palace Eunuchs of Imperial China (Prometheus Books, 1990)
 Taisuke Mitamura (trans. by Charles A. Pomeroy), Chinese Eunuchs: The Structure of Intimate Politics (Tuttle Publishing, 1970)
 Shih-Shan Henry Tsai, The Eunuchs in the Ming Dynasty (State University of New York Press, 1995)
 English language Abstracts of the thesis
 Research on the System of Imperial Harem in Liao Dynasty
 Research on the System of Imperial Harem in Liao Dynasty 
 In Our Time: The Eunuch. Presenter: Melvyn Bragg. Interviewed Guests: Karen Radner, Professor of Ancient Near Eastern History at University College London; Shaun Tougher, Reader in Ancient History at Cardiff University; Michael Hoeckelmann, British Academy Postdoctoral Fellow in the Department of History at King's College London. Producer: Thomas Morris. Broadcaster: BBC Radio 4. Date: 26 February 2015

External links 

 
 
 

Eunuchs
Social history of China
Demographics of China